, commonly known as , is a Japanese professional football club based in Chōfu, Tokyo. The club plays in the J1 League, the top tier of football in the country. The team is one of four in the J.League to be simply called Football Club without an extended name.

History 
The team started as a company team, Tokyo Gas Soccer Club (東京ガスサッカー部) in 1933 Their first appearance in the national leagues was in 1991, the last season of the old Japan Soccer League. With addition of the Brazilian football player Amaral and the manager Kiyoshi Okuma at the helm, the team gradually became competitive and in 1997, the team finished second, winning the JFL championship the next year. However, at the time the team lacked the necessary qualifications for a promotion to the J1 league and so stayed in J2.

Following this, on 1 October 1998, companies like Tokyo Gas, TEPCO, ampm, TV Tokyo, and Culture Convenience Club, set up a joint company Tokyo Football Club Company with the aim of making the team eligible for joining the J.League. In 1999, the same year the team became eligible, they finished second in the J2 league and were automatically promoted to J1 beginning in the 2000 season. Despite a widespread belief that the team would barely win enough to stay in the J1, the team won four games in a row since its opening game and managed to finish at the 7th spot.

Helped by its winning record, the attendance shot up and it is still above that of well-known Tokyo Verdy 1969 that moved its home town from Kawasaki, Kanagawa in 2001. Since 2002, the team welcomed Hiromi Hara as its manager and aimed for a championship with a strong offense. The 2003 season had the team finish in 4th, its highest ever. In August of the same year, it held a friendly match against one of the greatest football clubs, Real Madrid losing 3–0 but gaining valuable experiences both on and off the field for what it takes to be a great football club.

Long-time leader Amaral, nicknamed The King of Tokyo by his fans, departed the team to join Shonan Bellmare in 2004. He was replaced by Athens Olympics national football team player Yasuyuki Konno from Consadole Sapporo. In November of the same year, it won the J.League Yamazaki Nabisco Cup for its first major title since joining the J.League.

After 10 years of participation in the J.League without a mascot character, the team adopted Tokyo Dorompa, a tanuki-like figure, as its mascot in January, 2009.

On 4 December 2010 FC Tokyo had to win their final game of the season away to already relegated Kyoto Sanga FC. FC Tokyo lost 2–0 and went back down to the second tier for the first time in 11 years. Nevertheless, they bounced back at the first attempt, winning the J2 title in November 2011.

Before their 2011 Emperor's Cup win, FC Tokyo reached the semifinals of the competition three times: in 1997 (as Tokyo Gas), 2008, and on 2010. Their 2011 win was remarkably special, as the club won the competition whilst being a J2 team. They became the first J2 team, and third among the second-tier champions overall (after NKK SC in 1981 and Júbilo Iwata in 1982), to accomplish the feat of winning the competition.

Stadium 

FC Tokyo uses Ajinomoto Stadium as its home ground (the official name of this stadium is Tokyo Stadium). For a long time it did not have a home stadium of its own and played at various football fields such as the National Olympic Stadium, the National Nishigaoka Football Field, Edogawa Special Ward Stadium, and the Komazawa Olympic Park Stadium, but in 2001 it finally found a permanent home. The club's training grounds are Sarue Ground in Kōtō, Tokyo, and Kodaira Ground in Kodaira, Tokyo.

Record as J.League member

Key

Honours 
FC Tokyo (1999-Present) /
Tokyo Gas SC (1935-1999)

National

League
Japan Football League/J2 League
Winners:  1998, 2011
Regional League Promotion Series
Winners: 1990

Cups
Emperor's Cup
Winners: 2011
J.League Cup
Winners: 2004, 2009, 2020

International 
Suruga Bank Championship
Winners (1): 2010

Players

Current squad 
.

Type 2
Type 2

Out on loan

Reserve squad (FC Tokyo U-18) 
; Squad for the 2022 season.

World Cup players 
The following players have represented their country at the World Cup whilst playing for FC Tokyo:

  Teruyuki Moniwa (2006)
  Yoichi Doi (2006)
  Yasuyuki Konno (2010)
  Yuto Nagatomo (2010)
  Shuichi Gonda (2014)
  Masato Morishige (2014)

Olympic players 
The following players have represented their country at the Summer Olympic Games whilst playing for FC Tokyo:
 Naohiro Ishikawa (2004)
 Teruyuki Moniwa (2004)
 Yasuyuki Konno (2004)
 Yuhei Tokunaga (2004, 2012)
 Yōhei Kajiyama  (2008)
 Yuto Nagatomo  (2008)
 Shuichi Gonda  (2012)
 Sei Muroya  (2016)
 Shoya Nakajima  (2016)

Club officials 
For the 2023 season.

Manager history

Continental record

Personnel awards 
J.League Best Eleven
 Tuto (2000)
 Yoichi Doi (2004)
 Naohiro Ishikawa (2009)
 Yuto Nagatomo (2009)
 Masato Morishige (2013, 2014, 2015, 2019)
 Kosuke Ota (2014, 2015)
 Yoshinori Muto (2014)
 Akihiro Hayashi (2019)
 Sei Muroya (2019)
 Kento Hashimoto (2019)
 Kensuke Nagai (2019)
 Diego Oliveira (2019)
J.League Cup MVP
 Yoichi Doi (2004)
 Takuji Yonemoto (2009)
 Leandro (2020)
J.League Cup New Hero Award
 Yukihiko Sato (1999)
 Takuji Yonemoto (2009)

Former players

Kit evolution

See also

FC Tokyo (volleyball)
FC Tokyo U-23

References

External links

 FC Tokyo Official website  

 
Tokyo
Tokyo
Tokyo
Association football clubs established in 1935
Football clubs in Tokyo
Tokyo
Tokyo
Tokyo
Tokyo Gas Group
1935 establishments in Japan
Japan Football League (1992–1998) clubs